Adrorhizinae is an orchid subtribe in the tribe Vandeae.

Ecology

Pollination
Pollination by ants, flies, and carpenter bees has been reported.

Phylogeny 
One study identified this subtribe as the sister group to the subtribes Angraecinae and Aeridinae:

See also 
 Taxonomy of the Orchidaceae

References

External links 

 
Orchid subtribes